Below is the list of foreign delegations attending the 21st Congress of the Japanese Communist Party, held between 22-26 September 1997.

Cuba: Communist Party of Cuba
Alberto Rodriguez Arufe, Vice Chief of Department of International Relations
El Salvador: Farabundo Martí National Liberation Front:
Hector Acevedo Moreno, Secretary for Art and Culture, Vice Secretary for International Relations
France: French Communist Party
Paul Lespagnol, Secretariat Member
Germany: Party of Democratic Socialism
Helmut Scholz, Coordinator of Peace and International Policy Working Group
India: Communist Party of India
A.B. Bardhan, General Secretary
Communist Party of India (Marxist)
Sitaram Yechury, Politburo Member
Italy: Communist Refoundation Party
Claudio Grassi, National Secretariat Member
Jordan: Jordanian Communist Party
Amal Naffa, Politburo Member, Chief Editor of al-Jamahir
Laos: Lao People's Revolutionary Party
Thongsay Bodhisane, Ambassador to Japan
Mexico: Cardenist Party
Teresa Pandura, National Secretary of Finance
Guillermo Andrade, Central Committee Member
Portugal: Portuguese Communist Party
Albano Nunes, Secretariat Members, Head of International Department
Spain: Communist Party of Spain/United Left
Angela Sierra González, Member of the European Parliament
Sweden: Left Party
Jonas Sjöstedt, Member of the European Parliament
United States: Committees of Correspondence for Democracy and Socialism
Zachary Robinson, National Executive Committee Member
Vietnam: Communist Party of Vietnam
Pham The Duyet, Political Bureau Member
Pham Van Choung, Vice Chairman of the External Relations Commission
Doan Ngoc Canh, Head of Department of the External Relations Commission

Moreover, the following guests participated as individuals: John Manning (USA), Ole Korpeitan (Norway), Francisco Nemenzo (Philippines) and Gilma Camargo (Panama).

Messages to the congress were sent from
Bangladesh: Workers Party of Bangladesh
Cuba: Communist Party of Cuba
Cyprus: Progressive Party of Working People
Czech Republic: Communist Party of Bohemia and Moravia
El Salvador: Farabundo Martí National Liberation Front
Germany: German Communist Party
Greece: Communist Party of Greece
Hungary: Workers Party
India: Communist Party of India
India: Communist Party of India (Marxist)
Laos: Lao People's Revolutionary Party
New Zealand: Peace Council of Aotearoa-New Zealand, Inc.
Philippines: Akbayan
Philippines: BISIG
Portugal: Portuguese Communist Party
Russian Federation: International Association of Scholars for Democracy and Socialism
Slovakia: Communist Party of Slovakia
Sri Lanka: Communist Party of Sri Lanka
Sudan: Sudanese Communist Party
Switzerland: Swiss Party of Labour
Vietnam: Communist Party of Vietnam

References
Japanese Communist Party, For a Democratic Government in Japan in 21st Century, Japanese Communist Party 21st Congress. Tokyo: Japan Press Service, 1997.

Communist parties
Communists
Japanese Communist Party